"Change Me" is the first single from Ruben Studdard's third album The Return. The song is produced by The Underdogs and written by Luke Boyd, Tank, Steve Russell, Damon Thomas, Harvey Mason, Jr., and Antonio Dixon. The song follows Ruben complaining about his girlfriend trying to change what he's become. The song peaked at number 94 on the Billboard Hot 100 and number eighteen on the Hot R&B/Hip-Hop Songs chart.

Music video
The video shows Studdard dealing with his girlfriend (played by America's Next Top Model Cycle 5 contestant Bre Scullark) trying to change him from his celebrity life. Scenes in the video show her spending his credit card on a dining with her friends, and having the movers take his recording equipment into the garage.

A part of the song: "What if I talked about your face in the morning. 'Cause we know that you ain't cute in the morning," matches the girlfriend waking up with a bad hair day. They both become distraught like him signing autographs around her, and blocks her face during a party. The ending has Ruben packing her belongings in her luggage case and shows her the door out.

Charts

Weekly charts

Year-end charts

Release history

References

2006 singles
2006 songs
Ruben Studdard songs
J Records singles
Songs written by Damon Thomas (record producer)
Songs written by Harvey Mason Jr.
Song recordings produced by the Underdogs (production team)
Songs written by Antonio Dixon (songwriter)
Songs written by Tank (American singer)